The 12701 / 12702 Hussainsagar Express (also spelled Hussain Sagar Express) is a very popular train operated by South Central Railway between Hyderabad and Mumbai. Currently, it operates as a daily superfast train with train No 12701/12702.

Etymology

The train is named after the Hussain Sagar lake in Hyderabad, India built by Hussain Shah Wali in 1562, during the rule of Ibrahim Quli Qutb Shah.

The train was introduced as a replacement to the former Minar Express which operated between Secunderabad and Mumbai.

Train number 
12701: Mumbai CST–Hyderabad Deccan Hussainsagar express

12702: Hyderabad Deccan–Mumbai CST Hussainsagar express

The train travels a distance of 429 miles (790 km) in 13 hours 45 minutes at an average speed of 58.7 km/h.

Composition 
12701 Hussainsagar Express
ENG-SLR-GEN-S10-S9-S8-S7-S6-S5-S4-S3-S2-S1-B2-B1-A1-HA1-GEN-SLR

12702 Hussainsagar Express
ENG-SLR-GEN-A1-B1-B2-B3-S1-S2-S3-S4-S5-S6-S7-S8-S9-S10-GEN-SLR

The train has a rake-sharing arrangement (RSA) with the Hyderabad Mumbai Express.

Locomotive 

The Hussainsagar Express used to be hauled by WCM locomotive and later by WCAM-3 or WCG-2 locomotive of Kalyan shed between CSTM and Pune. After the start of DC to AC conversion of Pune to Kalyan stretch it was hauled by a single WDM-3A diesel locomotive from SCR's Diesel Loco Shed, Kazipet.

From mid 2013 onwards the loco links have been changed and it is now being hauled by Central Railway's Kalyan shed WDM-3A or WDM-3D or WDP-4D locomotive for its entire journey between Hyderabad and Mumbai CSMT.

However, with increase in the length of electrification between the entire section, it is now hauled by a Lallaguda-based WAP-7 or Vijayawada based WAP-4

Time Table

Gallery

See also

 Rail transport in India
 South Central Railway
 Famous trains
 Hyderabad
 Husain Sagar

References

External links

Transport in Mumbai
Transport in Hyderabad, India
Named passenger trains of India
Railway services introduced in 1978
Express trains in India
Rail transport in Telangana
Rail transport in Maharashtra
Rail transport in Karnataka